The Illinois Nature Preserves Commission (INPC) is a state organization, established by the Illinois Natural Areas Preservation Act, to identify, protect, steward, and defend high quality natural areas in the state of Illinois. Its mission is:
to assist private and public landowners in protecting high quality natural areas and habitats of endangered and threatened species; in perpetuity, through voluntary dedication or registration of such lands into the Illinois Nature Preserves System. The Commission promotes the preservation of these significant lands and provides leadership in their stewardship, management and protection.

Eligible land, public or private, may be dedicated as an Illinois Nature Preserve or a Land and Water Reserve.

The INPC comprises a volunteer board of commissioners that works with staff, landowners, and other stakeholders. Funding for INPC staff comes from the Illinois Department of Natural Resources and the Natural Areas Acquisition Fund. Since 2015, the position of Director has been vacant.

References

Environmental organizations established in 1963
State agencies of Illinois